Praveena Salani Chandrasekera (née Bandara) was the 18th Chairperson of the Sri Lanka Army Women's Corps Seva Vanitha Unit succeeding Mrs. Ramani Dematanpitiya.
She is the wife of former Master-General of the Ordnance of the Sri Lanka Army, Major General Prasanna Chandrasekera.

Early life
Born in 1975, Mrs. Praveena Salani Bandara was the older one of the two children in the family, younger brother Indika Bandara is the Director at Fashion Gallery, Shades of Wanamal in Colombo. She studied at a local school in Ratnapura, and later moved to Colombo for her higher education in fashion designing. In 2000, she married Major General Prasanna Chandrasekera and has two children, Daughter Nadara and Son Sanula.

Sri Lanka Army Women's Corps - Seva Vanitha Unit
Mrs. Praveena Bandara assumed Duties as the 18th Chairperson of the Sri Lanka Army Women's Corps Seva Vanitha Unit on 26 February 2020. During her time as the chairperson, there were several new accomplishments within the organization. Soon after her first general meeting on the 16th of March a donation was presented to an international award winner Corporal Nishanthi to mark the occasion as an appreciation by Mrs. Praveena. Later on 19 July 2020 they opened a newly constructed office for the current and upcoming presidents of the Sri Lanka Army Women's Corps Seva Vanitha Unit. And later they handed over a new accommodation building for lady officers of Sri Lanka Army Women's Corps in order to uplift the living standard of lady army officers in Sri Lanka under the  assistance of Mrs. Praveena. All of the above-mentioned occasions and many more were accomplished during her time as the chairperson of the SLAWC.

Current Employment
She is a fashion designer in occupation and currently working as a Director of the fashion gallery Shades of Wanamal.

References

1975 births
Living people
Sri Lankan Buddhists
Sinhalese women